{{DISPLAYTITLE:C12H18N4O4}}
The molecular formula C12H18N4O4 (molar mass: 282.30 g/mol, exact mass: 282.1328 u) may refer to:

 Dupracetam
 ICRF 193